Clenze is a municipality in the district Lüchow-Dannenberg, in Lower Saxony, Germany. It is situated approximately 20 km northwest of Salzwedel, and 25 km east of Uelzen.

The Polabian name of Clenze is Klǫcka (spelled Cloontzka in older German reference material).

Up until November 1, 2006, Clenze was the seat of the Samtgemeinde ("collective municipality") Clenze. It is now part of the Samtgemeinde Lüchow (Wendland).

References 

Lüchow-Dannenberg